The César Award for Best Actress is one of the César Awards, presented annually by the Académie des Arts et Techniques du Cinéma to recognize the outstanding performance in a leading role of an actress who has worked within the French film industry during the year preceding the ceremony. Nominees and winner are selected via a run-off voting by all the members of the Académie.

History

Superlatives

As of 2019, 82 actresses have been nominated in the category, with a total of 34 different winners. The average age at first nomination is 36 and the average age of winners at first win is 39.

With five wins (1982, 1984, 1989, 1995, 2010), Isabelle Adjani has the most Best Actress Césars. Six actresses have won two Best Actress Césars: Romy Schneider (1976, 1979), Sabine Azéma (1985, 1987), Catherine Deneuve (1981, 1993), Nathalie Baye (1983, 2006), Yolande Moreau (2005, 2009) and Isabelle Huppert (1996, 2017).

Adjani also holds the records for most César Awards in an acting category and for most Césars in a single artistic category. She is followed with 4 Césars by Dominique Blanc (1 Best Actress César and 3 Best Supporting Actress Césars) and Nathalie Baye (2 Best Actress Césars and 2 Best Supporting Actress Césars).

Isabelle Huppert holds the record of most nominations with 14. Including Best Supporting Actress, Huppert has been nominated a total of 16 times, which makes her the overall most-nominated female performer.

Four actresses share the record of most consecutive nominations with 3: Juliette Binoche (1992, 1993, 1994), Isabelle Huppert (2001, 2002, 2003), Kristin Scott Thomas (2009, 2010, 2011) and Catherine Deneuve (2014, 2015, 2016).

Cécile de France is the only actress to have been nominated for two different roles the same year, in 2007 for Avenue Montaigne and for When I Was a Singer. The Académie has since modified the nomination rules to ensure that no one could receive more than one individual nomination by category.

Eight women have won both the César Award for Best Actress and the César Award for Best Supporting Actress:
 Nathalie Baye (Best Supporting Actress in 1981 and 1982, Best Actress in 1983 and 2006)
 Annie Girardot (Best Actress in 1977, Best Supporting Actress in 1996 and 2002),
 Dominique Blanc (Best Supporting Actress in 1991, 1993 and 1999, Best Actress in 2001),
 Karin Viard (Best Actress in 2000, Best Supporting Actress in 2003 and 2019),
 Marion Cotillard (Best Supporting Actress in 2005, Best Actress in 2008),
 Emmanuelle Devos (Best Actress in 2002, Best Supporting Actress in 2010),
 Adèle Haenel (Best Supporting Actress in 2014, Best Actress in 2015),
 Catherine Frot (Best Supporting Actress in 1997, Best Actress in 2016).
Fanny Ardant (Best Actress in 1997, Best Supporting Actress in 2020)

Nathalie Baye is the only actress with multiple wins in both categories. She is also the only performer to have won an acting César in three consecutive years, in 1981, 1982 and 1983.

Three films have received both accolades: One Deadly Summer in 1984 (Best Actress to Isabelle Adjani, Best Supporting Actress to Suzanne Flon), Indochine in 1993 (Best Actress to Catherine Deneuve, Best Supporting Actress to Dominique Blanc) and Queen Margot in 1995 (Best Actress to Isabelle Adjani, Best Supporting Actress to Virna Lisi).

Five women have won the César Award for Best Actress after previously winning the César Award for Most Promising Actress:
 Sandrine Bonnaire (Most Promising Actress in 1984, Best Actress in 1986),
 Élodie Bouchez (Most Promising Actress in 1995, Best Actress in 1999),
 Sylvie Testud (Most Promising Actress in 2001, Best Actress in 2004),
 Sara Forestier (Most Promising Actress in 2004, Best Actress in 2011),
 Sandrine Kiberlain (Most Promising Actress in 1996, Best Actress in 2014).

Only one film has received both accolades: The Dreamlife of Angels in 1999 (Best Actress to Élodie Bouchez, Most Promising Actress to Natacha Régnier).

Thirteen women have received nominations in the three competitive acting categories: Best Actress, Best Supporting Actress and Most Promising Actress. They are Emmanuelle Béart, Charlotte Gainsbourg, Dominique Blanc, Anne Brochet, Karin Viard, Sandrine Kiberlain, Emmanuelle Devos, Cécile de France, Marion Cotillard, Sylvie Testud, Émilie Dequenne, Sara Forestier and Adèle Haenel. So far, no actress has achieved to win the three awards.

To date, the longest-living winner is Emmanuelle Riva, who died at 89, and the most short-lived is Romy Schneider, who died at 43. The oldest alive winner is Catherine Deneuve, aged 77, and the earliest alive winner is Miou-Miou (Memoirs of a French Whore, 1980).

Posthumous nominations
There have been only two posthumous nominations for any acting César and both occurred in the Best Actress category. Romy Schneider was nominated in 1983 for The Passerby, seven months after her death possibly by suicide. Pascale Ogier died of a drug overdose at 25, three months before receiving a nomination for Full Moon in Paris in 1985.

Romy Schneider is the only actress to have been presented a posthumous Honorary César, in 2008. Actor Alain Delon presented the César, as the date also corresponded to the forty years of the iconic film La Piscine in which they starred together. During the standing ovation, he turned towards a giant portrait of the actress and declared in German that she was the love of his life.

International presence
As the César Awards are centered on the French Cinema, the majority of recipients are French and performed in French language. The only non-French winner of the Best Actress César is Belgian actress Yolande Moreau (2005, 2009). Romy Schneider was born German, Virginie Efira was born Belgian and Bérénice Bejo Argentine, but both had become French naturalized citizens by the time of their wins.

International actresses who have received nominations are:
 Algeria: Soria Zeroual,
 Argentina: Bérénice Bejo, (she holds dual Argentine-French citizenship),
 Belgium: Cécile de France, Marie Gillain, Yolande Moreau, Émilie Dequenne, Virginie Efira (she holds dual Belgian-French citizenship),
 Denmark: Sidse Babett Knudsen,
 Germany: Nastassja Kinski, Barbara Sukowa
 Hong Kong: Maggie Cheung,
 Luxembourg: Vicky Krieps,
 Morocco: Loubna Abidar,
 Switzerland: Irène Jacob,
 United Kingdom: Jane Birkin, Charlotte Rampling, Tilda Swinton, Kristin Scott Thomas (she holds dual British-French citizenship),
 United States: Julia Migenes.

The Best Actress César has been awarded twice for a foreign-language performance: to Isabelle Adjani for her English-language performance in Possession (1982) and to Sylvie Testud for her Japanese-language performance in Fear and Trembing (2004). In addition, Bérénice Bejo is the only performer in the history of the César to receive an award for a silent role, in The Artist (2012).

Winners and nominees
Following the Académie des Arts et Techniques du Cinéma (AATC)'s practice, the films below are listed by year of ceremony, which corresponds to the year following the film's year of release. For example, the César for Best Actress of 2010 was awarded on February 27, 2010 for a performance in a film released between January 1, 2009 and December 31, 2009.

Actresses are selected via a two-round vote: first round to choose the nominees, second round to designate the winner. All the members of the Académie, without regard to their branch, are eligible to vote on both rounds. The number of nominees, initially set to four, was expanded to five in 1984 and then to seven in 2012.

Winners are listed first in bold, followed by the other nominees in alphabetic order.

1970s

1980s

1990s

2000s

2010s

2020s

Multiple wins and nominations

The following individuals received two or more Best Actress awards:

The following individuals received three or more Best Actress nominations:

See also
Lumières Award for Best Actress
Magritte Award for Best Actress
European Film Award for Best Actress
Academy Award for Best Actress
Nastro d'Argento for Best Actress
BAFTA Award for Best Actress
David di Donatello for Best Actress
Goya Award for Best Actress

References

External links
 
 César Award for Best Actress at AlloCiné

Actress
 
Film awards for lead actress